Haworthia mirabilis is a species of the genus Haworthia belonging to the family Asphodelaceae.

Etymology
The genus name Haworthia honors the British botanist Adrian Hardy Haworth (1767–1833), while the species epitheton mirabilis derives from Latin and means "wonderful”.

Description

It is usually a solitary stemless plant. The leaves are green, with longitudinal pale green lines along the upper surfaces and small teeth along the margins. They turn to brownish or reddish in the sun. The leaves form a rosette and the flowers are white and small, in an inflorescence.

This highly variable species is one of the "retuse" species of Haworthia, meaning that it usually grows sunken beneath the ground with its flattened leaves only showing on the surface. Its rosette of succulent leaves are turned back ("retuse") so as to provide a flat and level face on the surface of the ground. In this form, it is similar to other retuse haworthias (e.g. Haworthia pygmaea, Haworthia bayeri, Haworthia springbokvlakensis, Haworthia magnifica, Haworthia emelyae and Haworthia retusa).

However Haworthia mirabilias can be distinguished from its relatives by the marginal bristles on the leaves, and the way that the leaves end in sharp points. They also usually have lines on the upper leaf faces.

Varieties
(*The names in bold in the list below are recognized as accepted names by WCSP as of February, 2018. )
 Haworthia mirabilis var. badia (Poelln.) M.B.Bayer
 Haworthia mirabilis var. beukmannii (Poelln.) M.B.Bayer
 Haworthia mirabilis var. calcarea M.B.Bayer
 Haworthia mirabilis var. consanguinea M.B.Bayer
 Haworthia mirabilis var. depauperata M.B.Bayer
 Haworthia mirabilis var. diversicolor M.B.Bayer
 Haworthia mirabilis var. mirabilis (autonym)
 [[Haworthia mirabilis var. mundula|Haworthia mirabilis var. mundula]] (G.G.Sm)M.B.Bayer
 Haworthia mirabilis var. paradoxa (Poelln.) M.B.Bayer
 Haworthia mirabilis var. sublineata (Poelln.) M.B.Bayer
 Haworthia mirabilis var. triebneriana (Poelln.)  M.B.Bayer

Further subdivisions
 Haworthia mirabilis var. magnifica is sometimes considered a separate species, Haworthia magnifica, which in turn includes the following varieties: 
 Haworthia magnifica var. asperula (Haw.) Breuer
 Haworthia magnifica var. atrofusca (G.G.Sm.) M.B.Bayer
 Haworthia magnifica var. magnifica (autonym)
 Haworthia magnifica var. obserata (Marx) Breuer
 Haworthia magnifica var. splendens J.D.Venter & S.A.Hammer 
 Haworthia mirabilis var. maraisii (Poelln.) M.B.Bayer  is sometimes considered a separate species, Haworthia maraisii, which in turn includes the following varieties: 
 Haworthia maraisii var. maraisii (autonym)
 Haworthia maraisii var. meiringii (M.B.Bayer) M.B.Bayer
 Haworthia maraisii var. notabilis (Poelln.) M.B.Bayer

Variety calcarea is sometimes included in Haworthia rossouwii instead, as Haworthia rossouwii var. calcarea'').

Distribution
This species is native to the Western Cape, South Africa. 
Specifically it occurs in the Overberg District, near the far southern point of the country.

Habitat
It grows in rocky areas, especially slopes or ridges, at an altitude of about 500 meters. In habitat it is often found growing in the partial shelter of bushes or shrubs.

Notes

References
Tropicos
Plant list
Haworthia-gasteria

Bibliography
 Gibbs Russell, G. E., W. G. Welman, E. Reitief, K. L. Immelman, G. Germishuizen, B. J. Pienaar, M. v. Wyk & A. Nicholas. 1987. List of species of southern African plants. Mem. Bot. Surv. S. Africa 2(1–2): 1–152(pt. 1), 1–270(pt. 2).
 Natl. Cact. Succ. J. 32: 18 (1977).

mirabilis
Flora of the Cape Provinces
Endemic flora of South Africa
Garden plants